The 1992 Midwestern Collegiate Conference men's basketball tournament (now known as the Horizon League men's basketball tournament) was held March 12–14 at Riverfront Coliseum in Cincinnati, Ohio.

Evansville defeated  in the championship game, 95–76, to win their second MCC/Horizon League men's basketball tournament title.

The Purple Aces received an automatic bid to the 1992 NCAA tournament as the #8 seed in the Midwest region.

Format
All six conference members participated in the tournament and were seeded based on regular season conference records.

Bracket

References

Horizon League men's basketball tournament
Tournament
Midwestern City Conference men's basketball tournament
Midwestern City Conference men's basketball tournament